Květoslav Palov is a former Czechoslovak and Australian cyclist. He was the first Czech who has competed in the Tour de France. He uses a nickname Omar.

Květoslav Palov was born on 6 December 1962. He was a member of Czechoslovak national team in the 1980s. He refused to return from Italy where he raced in 1986.

In 1987, he participated as the first Czech in the Tour de France. With a Czechoslovak passport, he raced for British team ANC-Halfords. He finished the Tour as 103rd.

He raced professionally until 1991 and retired from his racing career in Australia.

He lives and runs a business in Rockhampton, Australia.

References

External links
Květoslav Palov at Cycling Archives

Czech male cyclists
Australian male cyclists
Cyclists from Queensland
Czechoslovak emigrants to Australia
Czechoslovak exiles
1962 births
Living people
Sportspeople from Brno